Vladimir Vasilyev (28 November 1935 – 28 January 2003) was a Soviet sailor. He competed at the 1972 Summer Olympics and the 1976 Summer Olympics.

References

External links
 

1935 births
2003 deaths
Soviet male sailors (sport)
Olympic sailors of the Soviet Union
Sailors at the 1972 Summer Olympics – Star
Sailors at the 1976 Summer Olympics – Tornado
Sportspeople from Saint Petersburg